La'b Hakimi (Rational game), also known as La'b Akili (Intelligent Game), is a mancala game played in Syria.

Rules 
The game has the same rules as La'b Madjnuni (Crazy Game) except the following:
At the beginning of the game, seven pieces are placed in each house
Each player may choose one of the seven houses under their control, instead of first taking from the house on their right.

References

Traditional mancala games